This is a list of notable footballers who have played for West Bromwich Albion. The aim is for this list to include all players that have played 100 or more senior matches for the club. Other players who have played an important role for the club can also be included, but the reason for their notability should be included in the 'Notes' column.

For a list of all West Brom players with a Wikipedia article, see, and for the current squad see the main West Bromwich Albion F.C. article.

Explanation of List

Players should be listed in chronological order according to the year in which they first played for the club, and then by alphabetical order of their surname. Appearances and goals should include substitute appearances, but exclude wartime matches. Further information on competitions/seasons which are regarded as eligible for appearance stats are provided below, and if a player's data is not available for any of these competitions an appropriate note should be added to the table.

League appearances
League appearances and goals should include data for the following league spells, but should not include test or play-off matches:
 Football League / Premier League: 1888–89 to present

Total appearances
The figures for total appearances and goals should include the League figures together with the following competitions:
  Football League test matches (1895–96) and play-off matches (1992–93, 2000–01, 2006–07)
 FA Cup; Charity Shield (1919–20, 1931–32, 1954–55, 1968–69)
 Football League Cup (from 1965 to 1966); Full Members Cup (1985–86 to 1990–91); Football League Trophy (1991–92, 1992–93)
 Fairs Cup (1966–67), UEFA Cup (1978–79, 1979–80, 1981–82); UEFA Cup Winners' Cup (1968–69)
 Anglo-Italian Cup (1969–70, 1970–71, 1993–94, 1995–96); Texaco Cup (1970–71, 1972–73, 1974–75); Anglo-Scottish Cup (1975–76, 1976–77)
 Watney Cup (1971–72); Tennent Caledonian Cup (1977–78, 1978–79)

Table

Statistics last updated on 1 July 2018.

References 
 
 Soccerbase stats (use Search for...on left menu and select 'Players' drop down)
 

 
West Bromwich Albion
Association football player non-biographical articles